Coulsdon Town is a ward in the London Borough of Croydon, covering part of the Coulsdon area of London in the United Kingdom. The ward currently forms part of Chris Philp MP's Croydon South constituency, which has one of the highest majority's for the Conservative Party in London. The ward largely replaced the Coulsdon West ward following boundary changes for the 2018 election.

List of Councillors

Mayoral election results 
Below are the results for the candidate which received the highest share of the popular vote in the ward at each mayoral election.

Ward Results

References

External links
Coulsdon West Residents' Association

Wards of the London Borough of Croydon